The Masiliwa snout-burrower (Hemisus brachydactylus), or Masiliwa shovelnose frog, is a species of frog in the family Hemisotidae. It is endemic to Tanzania.

Its natural habitats are dry savanna, moist savanna, and intermittent freshwater marshes.

References

Hemisus
Amphibians of Tanzania
Endemic fauna of Tanzania
Taxonomy articles created by Polbot
Amphibians described in 1963